Here and There, released in 1976,  is a live album by English musician Elton John; it is his fourteenth official album release. The title refers to the two concerts represented on the album: "Here" is a concert recorded at the Royal Festival Hall in London during the summer of 1974; "There" is a concert recorded at New York City's Madison Square Garden on 28 November 1974.

Track listing

Original LP and CD
 

Notes
 LP sides one and two were combined as tracks 1–9 on the earliest CD releases of the album.

1995 Mercury and 1996 Rocket reissue

Personnel
Track numbering refers to the 2-CD expanded reissues of the album.
Elton John – Piano, Vocals
Ray Cooper – Tambourine (CD No. 1 tracks 4, 6, 7, 8, 10, 12; CD No. 2 tracks 1, 2, 4, 7, 9–13), Congas (CD No. 1 tracks 2, 3, 5, 6, 7, 8, 12; CD No. 2 tracks 3, 5, 6, 8), Bells (CD No. 1 track 6; CD No. 2 track 9), Vibes (CD No. 1 track 7; CD No. 2 track 2), Duck Call on "Honky Cat", Organ on "Crocodile Rock"
Lesley Duncan – Vocals ("Love Song" only)
Davey Johnstone – Guitars (except CD No. 1 tracks 1, 2, 11), Background vocals (except : CD No. 1 tracks 1, 2, 5, 8, 9, 11; CD No. 2 tracks 5–8, 9, 12–13), Mandolin on "Honky Cat"
John Lennon – Guitar, Vocals (CD No. 2, tracks 8–10 only)
Dee Murray – Bass (except CD No. 1 tracks 1, 11), Background vocals (except: CD No. 1 tracks 1, 2, 5, 8, 9, 11; CD No. 2 tracks 5–8, 9, 12–13)
Nigel Olsson – Drums (except CD No. 1 tracks 1, 11), Background vocals (except: CD No. 1 tracks 1, 2, 5, 8, 9, 11; CD No. 2 tracks 5–8, 9, 12–13)

Production
Producer: Gus Dudgeon
Engineers: Gus Dudgeon, Phil Dunne
Compilation: Gus Dudgeon
Art direction: David Larkham
Design: David Larkham
Photography: David Nutter
Liner notes: John Tobler

Charts

Weekly charts

Year-end charts

Certifications

References

External links

Albums produced by Gus Dudgeon
1976 live albums
Elton John live albums
Albums recorded at Madison Square Garden
DJM Records albums
MCA Records live albums